The 2023 Los Angeles FC season will be the club's sixth season in Major League Soccer, the top tier of the American soccer pyramid. LAFC plays its home matches at BMO Stadium in the Exposition Park neighborhood of Los Angeles, California. The venue was renamed prior to the start of the season.

Squad

First-team roster

Coaching staff

Transfers

Transfers in

Transfers out

Draft picks

Competitions

All matches are in Pacific Time

Preseason

Coachella Valley Invitational

MLS

Standings

Western Conference

Overall

Matches

All matches are in Pacific time

U.S. Open Cup

Los Angeles FC will enter the Open Cup at the Round of 32.

CONCACAF Champions League

Los Angeles FC qualified for the tournament as the 2022 Supporters' Shield winners and MLS Cup 2022 winners.

All matches are in Pacific Time.

Round of 16

Quarterfinals

Leagues Cup

Los Angeles FC will enter the Leagues Cup in the Round of 32

Knockout round

Statistics

References

2023 in Los Angeles
2023 in sports in California
2023 Major League Soccer season
American soccer clubs 2023 season
2023
2023 CONCACAF Champions League participants seasons